WB Games New York (formerly Agora Games, Inc.), is a video game development company based in Troy, New York that works with game developers to build online features and web-based communities for video games. The company was founded by Michael DelPrete as Agora Studios Inc. and grew out of an RPI project. Their software game-play statistics for games including Call of Duty: World at War, Guitar Hero, and numerous other franchises.

Major League Gaming acquired Agora Games on August 18, 2009. The studio was later sold to become a development studio within Warner Bros. Interactive Entertainment (now Warner Bros. Games) in 2017, expanding its team, also rebranding to WB Games New York within the following year.

References

External Links 
Official website
Video game companies of the United States
Video game development companies
Companies based in New York (state)